Armand "Papa Joe" Chevalier (September 12, 1948 – June 3, 2011) was a sports radio and talk radio host from Las Vegas, Nevada. His show, "The Papa Joe Show," was heard on Sporting News Radio until 2005. Papa Joe had brief stints in independent syndication, on Lifestyle Talk Radio Network, and Sports Byline USA, and the now-defunct Sports Fan Radio Network. Papa Joe's program aired from the studios of KNUU 970 AM in Las Vegas.

He was known for "Bite Me Wednesday," in which he would encourage fans to call in and air grievances 

Chevalier died June 3, 2011, several months after he had suffered a stroke that paralyzed his right side.

References

External links

Official website
Audio archives of the show

1948 births
2011 deaths
American sports radio personalities
People from the Las Vegas Valley